Mr. 12 String Guitar is an instrumental folk album featuring the 12 string guitar of American singer/guitarist Glen Campbell, released in 1966 (see 1966 in music).

Track listing

Side 1:
 "All I Really Want To Do" (Bob Dylan) – 2:30
 "It Ain't Me Babe" (Bob Dylan) – 2:35
 "You've Got Your Troubles" (Roger Greenaway, Roger Cook) – 2:50
 "Catch the Wind" (Donovan) – 2:20
 "Mr. Tambourine Man" (Bob Dylan) – 2:14
 "Subterranean Homesick Blues" (Bob Dylan) – 2:25
 
Side 2:
 
 "Like a Rolling Stone" (Bob Dylan) – 2:55
 "I Don't Believe You" (Bob Dylan) – 2:37
 "Eve Of Destruction" (P.F. Sloan) – 2:29
 "Blowin' in the Wind" (Bob Dylan) – 2:30
 "Colours" (Donovan) – 2:04
 "The 'In' Sound" (Glen Campbell) – 2:08

Personnel
Glen Campbell – 12 string guitar
Bob Morris – acoustic guitar
Jerry Cole – acoustic guitar, bass guitar
Larry Knechtel – harmonica, organ
Lyle Ritz – bass guitar
Tommy Morgan – harmonica
Donny Cotton – drums
Richie Frost – drums

Production
Producer – Richard Bock
Album design – Woody Woodward

Glen Campbell albums
1966 albums
Instrumental albums
World Pacific Records albums